San José de Metán (usually shortened to Metán) is a city in the south of the province of Salta, Argentina, 160 km from the provincial capital Salta, on National Routes 9 and 34. It is the head town of the Metán Department.

Climate

References
Notes

Sources
 

Populated places in Salta Province
Populated places established in 1859
1859 establishments in Argentina